John Minh Tran is a Canadian cinematographer. He is most noted as a two-time winner of the Canadian Screen Award for Best Photography in a Documentary Program or Factual Series, winning at the 3rd Canadian Screen Awards in 2015 for Our Man in Tehran and at the 10th Canadian Screen Awards in 2022 for Borealis.

References

External links

Canadian cinematographers
Canadian Screen Award winners
Living people
Year of birth missing (living people)